The 1997 Indonesian motorcycle Grand Prix was the fourteenth round of the 1997 Grand Prix motorcycle racing season. It took place on 28 September 1997 at the Sentul International Circuit.

500 cc classification

250 cc classification

125 cc classification

References

Indonesian motorcycle Grand Prix
Indonesia
Motorcycle Grand Prix